Aaron Heinzen (born August 9, 1979) is a former American soccer player who played professionally for three seasons with Portland Timbers before being released in 2005. He now serves as the USL play-by-play commentator for Portland Timbers 2 home matches.

References

External links
 University of Washington bio

1979 births
Living people
American soccer players
Washington Huskies men's soccer players
Seattle Sounders Select players
Portland Timbers (2001–2010) players
Association football defenders
Soccer players from Washington (state)
USL League Two players
A-League (1995–2004) players
USL First Division players